Carl G. Bachmann (May 14, 1890 – January 22, 1980) was a United States Congressman from Wheeling, West Virginia.

Bachmann was born in Wheeling as the son of Charles F. and Sophia Bachmann; three of his grandparents were German immigrants. In 1908 he graduated from Linsly Institute. He went to college first at Washington and Jefferson College for two years, and later graduated from West Virginia University, where he was a member of Phi Sigma Kappa fraternity. He later graduated from law school at West Virginia University in 1915.

On July 14, 1914, he married Susan Louise Smith. They had three children: Charles F., Gilbert S. and Susan Jane.

In 1915, Bachmann began to practice law in Wheeling, and in 1917 he was appointed assistant prosecuting attorney for Ohio County. In 1920 he was elected prosecuting attorney, serving from January 1921 to December 1924.

In November 1924 he was elected to the United States House of Representatives as a Republican, to serve in the First Congressional District of West Virginia. From 1931 to 1933 Bachmann was the Minority Whip.
He served as a Congressman until he was defeated in 1932. He was later elected Mayor of Wheeling in 1947 and served until 1951. He died in Wheeling and is buried in Greenwood Cemetery.

References

External links
  Information on Bachmann
 Picture

1890 births
1980 deaths
20th-century American lawyers
20th-century American politicians
American Presbyterians
American people of German descent
Burials at Greenwood Cemetery (Wheeling, West Virginia)
Linsly School alumni
Mayors of places in West Virginia
Politicians from Wheeling, West Virginia
Washington & Jefferson College alumni
Lawyers from Wheeling, West Virginia
West Virginia University College of Law alumni
Republican Party members of the United States House of Representatives from West Virginia